James Kari is a linguist and Professor Emeritus with the Alaska Native Language Center at the University of Alaska Fairbanks (UAF) specializing in the Dene (a.k.a. Athabascan languages) of Alaska.  For over fifty years he has done extensive linguistic work in many Dene languages including Ahtna, Dena'ina, Koyukon, Deg Hit'an, Holikachuk, Lower Tanana, Middle Tanana, Tanacross, Upper Tanana, and Babine-Witsuwit'en. He was on the faculty of UAF from 1973 until his retirement in 1997. He continues to work on numerous Alaska Native language projects. He is the author or editor of over 200 publications, including more than 4000 pages of bilingual texts in seven Dene languages. He is the most prolific contributor to the Alaska Native Language Archive (with more than 1000 entries as of 2019). His special interest is Dene ethnogeography, and he has compiled or documented more than 14,000 place names in fourteen Alaska or Canadian Dene languages.  He worked with Dena'ina writer and ethnographer Peter Kalifornsky on a 1991 compilation of his creative writings. In 2008 he was the organizer of the Dene–Yeniseian Symposium in Alaska, and co-editor of the volume The Dene–Yeniseian Connection published in 2010. In 2009 was selected Kari for the Alaska Governor's Award for the Humanities. In March 2013 Kari received the Professional Achievement Award at the 40th annual meeting of the Alaska Anthropological Association. In 2019 he was presented with a volume of papers by colleagues that recognize his career in Dene research (Holton and Thornton 2019).

Education
 Ph.D., University of New Mexico (Curriculum & Instruction and Linguistics), 1973;  Doctoral dissertation: Navajo Verb Prefix Phonology
 M.A.T., Reed College (Literature), 1969
 U. S. Peace Corps, Teacher of English as a Foreign Language, Bafra Lisesi, Bafra, Turkey, 1966–68
 B.A., University of California at Los Angeles (English), 1966

Selected works
Articles
 Kari, James. 1989  Some Principles of Alaskan Athabaskan Toponymic Knowledge. In General and Amerindian Ethnolinguistics, In Remembrance of Stanley Newman, ed. by M. R. Key and H. Hoenigswald. Berlin: Walter de Gruyter, pp. 129–151. (ANLA: TI972K1989)
 Kari, James. 1989.  Affix Positions and Zones in the Athabaskan Verb Complex: Ahtna and Navajo. International Journal of American Linguistics 55:424 455
 Kari, James. 1991. On the language effort and language work in Alaska Athabaskan. The Council, Dec. 1991, p. 8. (ANLA: CA973K1991)
 Kari, James. 1992. Some Concepts in Ahtna Athabaskan Word Formation. In Morphology Now, ed. by Mark Aronoff; SUNY Series in Linguistics, SUNY Press, pp. 107–133. (ANLA: AT973K1992)
 Kari, James. 1996. Linguistic Traces of Dena'ina Strategy at the Archaic Periphery. In Adventures Through Time: Readings in the Anthropology of Cook Inlet, ed. by Nancy Davis. Anchorage: Cook Inlet Historical Society. (ANLA: TI972K1996)
 Kari, James. 1996.  A Preliminary View of Hydronymic Districts in Northern Athabaskan Prehistory.  Names 44:253-271.
 Kari, James. 2005. Language Work in Alaskan Athabaskan and its Relationship to Alaskan Anthropology. Alaska Journal of  Anthropology 3(1):105-119. (ANLA: CA973K2005)
Kari, James. 2010. The concept of geolinguistic conservatism in Na-Dene prehistory . In The Dene–Yeniseian Connection. Anthropological Papers of the University of Alaska. Vol. 5, new series. pp. 194–222.
 Kari. James. 2011  A Case Study in Ahtna Athabascan Geographic Knowledge. In   Landscape in Language, Transdisciplinary Perspectives, ed. by D.M. Mark, A.G. Turk, N. Burenhult & D.Stea. Amsterdam: John Benjamins, pp. 239–260. (ANLA:
 Kari. James. 2019  The Resilience of Dene Generative Geography, Considering "The Nen' Yese Ensemble." Alaska Journal of Anthropology vol. 17(1-2):44-76.Books Kari, James. 1976. Navajo Verb Prefix Phonology.  New York: Garland Publishing Company.  328 pp.
 Kari, James. 1979. Athabaskan Verb Theme Categories: Ahtna. Alaska Native Language Center Research Paper No. 2, 230pp.
 Kari, James. 1986.  Tatl'ahwt'aenn Nenn', The Headwaters People's Country, Narratives of the Upper Ahtna Athabaskans. Told by Katie John et al. Fairbanks: ANLC. 221 pp.
 Kari, James. 1990. Ahtna Athabaskan Dictionary. Fairbanks: ANLC. 712 pp.
Kari, James. 1996.Ttheek'ädn Ut'iin Yaaniida' Oonign' , Old Time Stories of the Scottie Creek People. Told in Upper Tanana Athabaskan, by Mary Tyone. ANLC.
 Kari, James. (editor-in-chief). 2000. Koyukon Athabaskan Dictionary by Jules Jetté and Eliza Jones. ANLC. 1118 pp.
 Kari, James. 2005. Upper Inlet Dena'ina Language Lessons, by Sava Stephan.  Alaska Native Heritage Center.
 Kari, James. 2007, 2011. Dena’ina Topical Dictionary. ANLC. 367 pp. Revised Edition [Reviewed in IJAL vol. 75:110-113 by Keren Rice.]
 Kari, James. 2008. (editor) Shtutda’ina Da’a Sheł Qudeł, My Forefathers are Still Walking with Me, Verbal Essays on Tsaynen and Qizhjeh Traditions. By Andrew Balluta. Anchorage: National Park Service.
 Kari, James. 2010. Ahtna Travel Narratives, a Demonstration of Shared Geographic Knowledge among Alaska Athabascans.  Fairbanks: Alaska Native Language Center.Co-editor or co-author of:'''
 Kari, James, and Priscilla Russell Kari. 1982. Dena’ina Ełnena: Tanaina Country. Fairbanks: Alaska Native Language Center.
 Kalifornsky, Peter. 1991 K'tl'egh'i Sukdu, A Dena'ina Legacy: The Collected Writings of Peter Kalifornsky edited by James Kari and Alan Boraas. Fairbanks: Alaska Native Language Center. [520 pp. Reprinted in 2001 with a new introduction by the editors.]
 Kari, James and James A. Fall. 2016. Shem Pete's Alaska: The Territory of the Upper Cook Inlet Dena'ina. Revised Second edition. Fairbanks: University of Alaska Press.
 Kari, James. (linguistic editor). 2003. Bird Traditions of the Lime Village Area Dena'ina, Upper Stony River Ethno-Ornithology. by Russell, Priscilla N. and George C. West. Fairbanks: Alaska Native Knowledge Network.
 Kari, James. (linguistic editor). 2007. Dnaghelt’ana Qut’ana K’eli Ahdelyax, They Sing the Songs of Many Peoples, The 1954 Nondalton recordings of John Coray. by Craig Coray. Anchorage: Kijik Corporation.
 Kari, James and Ben A. Potter (editors). 2010. The Dene–Yeniseian Connection. Anthropological Papers of the University of Alaska. Vol. 5, new series. 369 pp. .
 Kari, James and Alan Boraas, Aaron Leggett, and R. Greg Dixon. 2017 Bibliography of sources on Dena'ina and Cook Inlet anthropology through 2016 (UAscholarworks: https://scholarworks.alaska.edu/handle/11122/8285]).
 Kari, James and Siri G. Tuttle (editors). 2019. Yenida'atah, Ts'utsaede, K'adiide, in Legendary Times, Ancient Times and Recent Times, an Anthology of Ahtna Narratives. ANLC. 208 pp.
 Holton, Gary and Thomas M. Thornton. 2019. Language and Toponymy in Alaska and Beyond, Papers in Honor of James Kari.'' Language Documentation and Conservation Special Publication, No. 17. Alaska Native Language Center and University of Hawaii Press. Honolulu.

References

External links
Table of contents and ordering information for The Dene–Yeniseian Connection.
Alaska Native Language Center
Alaska Native Language Archive
Curriculum vitae for James Kari

Living people
1944 births
Linguists from the United States
University of Alaska Fairbanks faculty
Linguists of Na-Dene languages
Linguists of Navajo
Paleolinguists
Linguists of Dené–Yeniseian languages
Writers from Alaska
Scientists from Alaska